Kirsten Miller is a South African novelist, writer and artist with six full-length books published between 2006 and 2021.

Education
Miller has a BA (Hons.) cum laude and an MA summa cum laude from the University of KwaZulu-Natal.

Career
Kirsten has held jobs as a university lecturer, creativity teacher and dolphin trainer and has lived in Gqeberha, London, Cape Town and Johannesburg.

Miller currently lives in Durban and runs the Kirsten Miller Creative Studio located in the grounds of the renowned Phansi Museum . The studio  provides courses and individual interaction in writing, art, literacy and development for neurodivergent and neurotypical people.

Kirsten was formerly the founding director of the NGO  Action in Autism which provides support and resources for autistic children and adults and their families. The organization also lobbies government and civil society to improve quality of life for people with Autism Spectrum Disorders (ASD). 

Her spare time is spent attending to her artwork and writing.

Author
Miller's first book Children on the Bridge: A Story of Autism in South Africa is an autobiographical account of her early work as a tutor of autistic children. It details her experiences working with these children and their families and the effect this work has on her personal life.

Her first novel, All is Fish, was shortlisted for the 2005 European Union Literary Awards. The novel is set in the resort town of Mtunzini in Zululand, South Africa and deals warmly with the complex relationships between the three central protagonists.

In 2014, the novel Sister Moon  was published by Umuzi, Random House. Sister Moon is a story of love and growing up, of exclusion and abuse. Two further novels The Hum of the Sun and All That is Left were published by NB Publishers, under their imprint Kwela Books, in 2018 and 2020 respectively. The Hum of the Sun has been translated into German for the Basel-based publisher Baobab Books. The novel was released in Europe in September 2021 under the title Hörst du, wie der Himmel singt?.

Miller has published short stories in five collections and was also a three times finalist in the SA Pen Awards. In 2012 her autism themed play "Remember Joe" was published in Short, Sharp and Snappy, a collection of plays by South African playwrights and authors. Miller was a featured book reviewer for the Sunday Times and has contributed regularly to South African Airways' in-flight magazine Sawubona until 2014.

Miller has written an illustrated children's book titled A Time for Fairies, which was published in South Africa in 2008.

Public and TV appearances

Miller was featured in the 2008, 2015, 2018 and 2020 Time of the Writer International Writers Festivals alongside Breyten Breytenbach, Charles Mungoshi, Ananda Devi and John Pilger. Kirsten has been a participant in the Franschhoek Literary Festival, the Midlands Literary Festival and the Karoo Writer's Festival.

SABC TV featured Kirsten Miller in the series The Power Within, aired in December 2009, where she discussed her work in autism, writing and art. She has made a number of TV and radio appearances where she has spoken about her writing and about her work in autism.

Artist

Kirsten works in mosaics, oils and watercolours, drawing inspiration from her surroundings and thoughts. She has completed commissions from the National Arts Council for large scale mosaic pieces working with autistic people. Johannesburg's Unity Gallery has held solo exhibitions of her work in 2005 and 2012. 

Her life-size fabric, beads and fiberglass commission of African Moo-nlight for CowParade was purchased on auction by the brewer SABMiller.

Literary awards
 Her first novel, All is Fish, was shortlisted for the 2005 European Union Literary Awards.
 3 times finalist in the SA Pen Awards for short stories.
 In 2016, Miller won the Wilbur Smith Adventure Writing Prize for Best Unpublished Adventure Manuscript with "The Hum of the Sun". Her prize from the Wilbur and Niso Smith Foundation allowed her to travel to Ireland and Spain, spending time in the cities of Dublin and Barcelona to do research for a future unnamed novel. The Hum of the Sun was published by Kwela Books in 2018.
 In 2018 and 2019, Miller won the Aziz Hassim Literary Awards (Main Category) awarded by the Minara Organisation for her manuscript "Comfortable Skin" (published in March 2020 as All That Is Left) and her published work The Hum of the Sun.
 The Hum of the Sun was long-listed for the 2020 International Dublin Literary Award along with Cynthia Jele, Tim Winton and Haruki Murakami

Selected publications

Literary Fiction
Hörst du, wie der Himmel singt? (Baobab) 2021
All That is Left - (Kwela) 2020
The Hum of the Sun - (Kwela) 2018
 Sister Moon - (Umuzi) 2014
 All is Fish - (Jacana) 2007

Autobiography
 Children on the Bridge: A Story of Autism in South Africa  - (Jacana) 2006

Short stories and plays in collections
 "Remember Joe" in Short, Sharp and Snappy - 2012
 "Mobile" in Africa Inside Out - 2012
 "Only in Art" in New Writing from Africa - 2009
 "Chance Encounter" in Dinaane: Short Stories by South African Women - 2007
 "The Chief's Spell" in African Road - 2006
 "White Boy" in African Compass - 2005
 "When the Master Calls" in Uncovered Mirrors - 1999

Illustrated children's book
A Time for Faeries - (Reach) 2008

References

External links
 Kirsten Miller Homepage
SABC TV Interview - All that is Left and TOW2020
  Radio Interview on The Hum of the Sun
  TV Interview on The Hum of the Sun
  Review of The Hum of the Sun on Afroliterature 
 UKZN Centre for Creative Arts - Kirsten Miller Bio 
  Tips on Writing a Winning Manuscript
 KZN Literary Tourism - Kirsten Miller
 Wilbur and Niso Smith Foundation - Kirsten Miller in Ireland
 Wilbur and Niso Smith Foundation - Kirsten Miller visits Barcelona
 Sister Moon Review
 Action in Autism
 Autism South Africa 
 All is fish, or is it? In conversation with Kirsten Miller, author of All is Fish
 Janet van Eeden in conversation with Kirsten Miller about All is Fish 
 International Time of the Writer - Author Bio: Kirsten Miller
 Tymon Smith chats to Kirsten Miller - audio download 
 Kirsten Miller Reads from All is Fish - youtube video
 Kirsten Miller Reviews Justin Cartwright's "To Heaven by Water"

Living people
South African women novelists
Year of birth missing (living people)
20th-century South African novelists
20th-century South African writers
20th-century South African women writers